James Kerr (died 18 February 1933) was an English football manager.  During his nine-year career as a manager, he coached Walsall, Coventry City and Norwich City.

References

1933 deaths
Norwich City F.C. managers
Walsall F.C. managers
Coventry City F.C. managers
English football managers
Year of birth missing